Jack Hunt School, officially Jack Hunt School Language College, is a co-educational secondary school and sixth form located in Netherton in the city of Peterborough in the United Kingdom. Students are aged 11 (Year 7) to 18 (Year 13). Refurbishment of the premises, as part of the Peterborough Secondary School Review, increased the capacity by one form of entry in each year group, with a similar increase in the sixth form, amounting to around an extra 175 places.

History
The school was officially opened by Alderman Dr. Jack Hunt, chairman of the Education Committee of the then Huntingdon and Peterborough County Council, after whom it is named. Briefly, until education in the county was reorganised in 1976, it functioned as a grammar school.

Jack Hunt School became a Beacon school in September 1999 for an initial period of three years. Following a successful application to the then Department for Education and Skills, Beacon status was granted for a further three years with effect from September 2002. In 2003, the school was reopened as a specialist Language College by John Simpson CBE. In 2004, Beacon schools came to an end nationally and Jack Hunt successfully applied to become a new Leading Edge School.

In September 2001 racial tensions escalated at the school following the racist murder of former pupil Ross Parker in the city shortly after the September 11th Attacks. Three Asian pupils were suspended in October 2001 following an attack on another pupil but the school and headmaster Chris Hilliard were later praised in Parliament for the way they managed to overcome such problems.

On 16 January 2012, the school received a hoax call stating that a bomb had been planted on the premises. Subsequently the entire school had to be evacuated. The pupils were left outside for hours, leading to numerous complaints from parents. In response, and as a token of apology, the head purchased a doughnut for every pupil.

Previously a foundation school administered by Peterborough City Council, in April 2018 Jack Hunt School converted to academy status. The school is now sponsored by Peterborough Keys Academies Trust.

Facilities
Jack Hunt Pool is an 82 feet (25 m) dual-use facility, built on the premises but open to the general public. Jack Hunt is also home to Peterborough's Yamaha School. The school offers Keyboard, Guitar and Drumming to the community.

In 2019 Jack Hunt opened a new block with a new dining facility, new classrooms and an all-weather astro turf football pitch.

Notable former pupils
 Fatima Manji, a Reporter, Channel 4 News
Aston Merrygold: member of boyband JLS.
Keith Palmer: better known as Maxim, MC with dance act The Prodigy.
James Fox, Paralympic Rower. Part of team that won gold at the 2017 Paralymic Games.
Kirsty Bowden, GB and England hockey player, Olympian and Commonwealth Games medallist.

References

External links
Jack Hunt School
Jack Hunt Pool
Bouygues (UK) Construction

Secondary schools in Peterborough
Educational institutions established in the 1970s
Academies in Peterborough
Specialist language colleges in England